Canisteo may refer to:

Places in the United States
 Canisteo (town), New York, in Steuben County
 Canisteo (village), New York, in Steuben County
 Canisteo River, a tributary of the Tioga River in New York
 Canisteo Township, Minnesota, in Dodge County

Other
 Canisteo Peninsula, Antarctica
 USS Canisteo (AO-99), US Navy ship